is a Japanese footballer currently playing as a forward for FC Imabari.

Career statistics

Club
.

Notes

References

External links

1992 births
Living people
Japanese footballers
Association football forwards
Kanto Gakuin University alumni
Japan Football League players
J3 League players
FC Osaka players
FC Imabari players